The Pat-kai (Pron:pʌtˌkaɪ) or Patkai Bum  (Burmese: Kumon Taungdan)  are a series of mountains in the Indo-Myanmar border falling in the north-eastern Indian states of Arunachal Pradesh, Nagaland and Upper Burma region of Myanmar. They were created by the same tectonic processes that created the Himalayas in the Mesozoic. In Tai-Ahom language, Pat means to cut and Kai means chicken.

Geography
The Patkai range mountains are not as rugged as the Himalayas and the peaks are much lower. Features of the range include conical peaks, steep slopes and deep valleys.

Three mountain ranges come under the Patkai. The Patkai-Bum, the Garo-Khasi-Jaintia hills and the Lushai Hills. The highest point of this range is Phawngpui Tlang, which is also known as 'Blue Mountain'. The Garo-Khasi range is in the Indian state of Meghalaya. Mawsynram and Cherrapunji, on the windward side of these mountains are the world's wettest places, having the highest annual rainfall.

The climate range from temperate to alpine due to differences in altitude.

The Pangsau Pass offers the most important route through the Patkai. The Ledo Road was built through Pangsau Pass as a strategic supply road over the duration of World War II to link India with the Burma Road and finally onto China.

In World War 2, the Patkai Range was considered a part of The Hump by the Allied Forces.

See also
Arakan Mountains
List of Ultras of Southeast Asia
Dehing Patkai Festival

Notes

External links
Patkai Hills

The Geology of Burma (Myanmar)

Hills of Myanmar
Hills of Meghalaya
Tourism in Northeast India